The 2006 UNAF U-17 Tournament was the first edition of the UNAF U-17 Tournament. It was held in Algeria, where it began on March 22 and concluded on March 27. Algeria was crowned champions after a drawing of lots.

Participants

Tournament

Champions

References

2006 in African football
2006
2006
2005–06 in Algerian football
2005–06 in Tunisian football
2005–06 in Egyptian football